Iroquois is a sculpture by American artist Mark di Suvero, owned by the Association for Public Art. The artwork is located at the Benjamin Franklin Parkway, at Eakins Oval and 24th Street, Philadelphia, United States. Iroquois is one of the many sculptures included in the Association's for Public Art's Museum Without Walls: AUDIO™ interpretive audio program for Philadelphia's outdoor sculpture.

Acquisition and installation 
The Association for Public Art (formerly the Fairmount Park Art Association) acquired and installed Iroquois in 2007 after it was donated by art patron and humanitarian David N. Pincus. The executive director of the Association for Public Art, Penny Balkin Bach, described the gift as "the most generous contribution made by a private donor to public sculpture in Philadelphia," and "the most important contemporary sculpture to come to Philadelphia since Claes Oldenburg's Clothespin in 1976." Before Iroquois came to Philadelphia, the sculpture had been on loan to the Frederik Meijer Gardens & Sculpture Park in Grand Rapids, Michigan. The sculpture stands alongside Symbiosis, a stainless steel "dendroid" sculpture by artist Roxy Paine that was installed by the Association for Public Art in 2014.

See also 
 List of public art in Philadelphia

References

External links 
Iroquois, Museum Without Walls: AUDIO™
https://web.archive.org/web/20081202213943/http://www.phillymag.com/articles/pulse_60_second_critic_public_art_iroquois_by_mark_di_suvero
Playing on Iroquois
"Mark di Suvero's Iroquois installation in Philadelphia II"

Outdoor sculptures in Philadelphia
Steel sculptures in Pennsylvania
1983 sculptures
Fairmount, Philadelphia
Works by Mark di Suvero